"Bringing in the Sheaves" is a popular American Gospel song used almost exclusively by Protestant Christians (though the content is not specifically Protestant in nature). The lyrics were written in 1874 by Knowles Shaw, who was inspired by Psalm 126:6, "He that goeth forth and weepeth, bearing precious seed, shall doubtless come again with rejoicing, bringing his sheaves with him." Shaw also wrote music for these words, but they are now usually set to a tune by George Minor, written in 1880.

Lyrics
Sowing in the morning, sowing seeds of kindness,
Sowing in the noontide and the dewy eve;
Waiting for the harvest, and the time of reaping,
We shall come rejoicing, bringing in the sheaves.

Refrain:
Bringing in the sheaves, bringing in the sheaves,
We shall come rejoicing, bringing in the sheaves,
Bringing in the sheaves, bringing in the sheaves,
We shall come rejoicing, bringing in the sheaves.

Sowing in the sunshine, sowing in the shadows,
Fearing neither clouds nor winter's chilling breeze;
By and by the harvest, and the labor ended,
We shall come rejoicing, bringing in the sheaves.

Refrain

Going forth with weeping, sowing for the Master,
Though the loss sustained our spirit often grieves;
When our weeping's over, He will bid us welcome,
We shall come rejoicing, bringing in the sheaves.

Refrain

In popular culture

 The hymn's refrain was sung in the 1933 movie Tillie and Gus starring W.C. Fields.
 The hymn was sung in the 1948 movie 3 Godfathers starring John Wayne.
 The hymn was sung in the 1955 movie The Night of the Hunter starring Robert Mitchum.
 Charles Ives used fragments of this and other 19th-century American secular and spiritual songs in his 2nd Symphony. 
 In the 1966 film Batman, this song is played by a marching band as Batman tries to dispose of a bomb.
 The hymn was sung in several episodes of the TV show Little House on the Prairie.
 The hymn's refrain was sung by Rod and Todd Flanders in the 1992 episode Bart the Lover of The Simpsons.
 The hymn's refrain was sung in the first episode of the 2020 miniseries The Queen's Gambit.

References

External links
 "Bringing in the Sheaves" Mp3 and lyrics

American Christian hymns
Thanksgiving songs
1874 songs
19th-century hymns